Komasi-ye Vosta (also Romanized as Komāsī-ye Vosţá; also known as Komāsī) is a village in Cheshmeh Kabud Rural District, in the Central District of Harsin County, Kermanshah Province, Iran. At the 2006 census, its population was 89, in 19 families.

References 

Populated places in Harsin County